William Groulx (born March 11, 1974) is an American wheelchair rugby player and cycler, and a member of the United States wheelchair rugby team.

He was part of the US team that took the gold medal at the 2008 Paralympic Games in Beijing, and a bronze medal in Athens in 2004. He won three medals for cycling in the 2016 Paralympics.

He served in the United States Navy from 1995 to 2001.

In 2001, he had a spinal cord injury after a motorcycle accident.

He was nominated for an ESPY Award in 2009, in the category Best Male Athlete with a Disability.

He is a member of the Paralyzed Veterans of America.

References

External links
 
 Will Groulx Profile on YouTube
 ATHLETE SPOTLIGHT: Quad Rugger Will Groulx, by Jennifer Sheffield, United States Quad Rugby Association, October 2003

1974 births
Living people
American wheelchair rugby players
American people with disabilities
Paralympic cyclists of the United States
Paralympic wheelchair rugby players of the United States
Paralympic gold medalists for the United States
Paralympic bronze medalists for the United States
Paralympic medalists in cycling
Paralympic medalists in wheelchair rugby
Wheelchair rugby players at the 2004 Summer Paralympics
Wheelchair rugby players at the 2008 Summer Paralympics
Wheelchair rugby players at the 2012 Summer Paralympics
Medalists at the 2004 Summer Paralympics
Medalists at the 2008 Summer Paralympics
Medalists at the 2012 Summer Paralympics
Medalists at the 2015 Parapan American Games
United States Navy sailors
University of Tennessee alumni
People from Clarksville, Tennessee
Sportspeople from Portland, Oregon